Lewis Trondheim (born Laurent Chabosy, on 11 December 1964) is a French cartoonist and one of the founders (in 1990) of the independent publisher L'Association. Both his silent comic La Mouche and Kaput and Zösky have been made into animated cartoons. He explained his choice of pseudonym after the Norwegian city of Trondheim as follows: "As a last name I wanted to use a city's name, but Lewis Bordeaux or Lewis Toulouse didn't sound so good. Then I thought about this city, Trondheim… Maybe someday I will publish a book under my real name, in order to remain anonymous."

Biography
Lewis Trondheim was first known as the author of Les formidables aventures de Lapinot (later to be translated to English as The Spiffy Adventures of McConey). He invented the character in the late 1980s as a way to learn cartooning.  The result was an initial 500 page graphic novel, Lapinot et les carottes de Patagonie.  All the while, he was publishing short stories for the satirical French magazine Psikopat.

After his book Slaloms was awarded what was then called the Alph'Art Coup de coeur (First comic book prize) in 1993, Trondheim was offered to bring his burgeoning series to a major publisher, Dargaud, while he continued churning out more personal books for L'Association and other independent French publishers such as Cornélius. From there onwards, Trondheim began to enjoy a steady rise in popularity.

The following years represented a period of increasing activity, as Trondheim began to work on many different projects. He first created La Mouche ("The Fly") for the Japanese market, and then redrew a French version from scratch, after which the character was adapted as an animated cartoon.

Trondheim's greatest breakthrough after Lapinot is arguably Dungeon (in French, Donjon), an ambitious series which he created with Joann Sfar, and which has enjoyed a fair amount of popular success.

In 1993, he married Brigitte Findakly, a comic colorist and screenwriter.

Trondheim's "retirement"
In 2004, after a long and intensive period during which he steadily released new books at a frantic pace, Lewis Trondheim announced he was more or less retiring from the world of comic strips, stating he did not want his passion to become a "job". He did draw and write a few stories within the following year, including a book reflecting on his decision to slow down, though the releases occurred at a much slower pace.

It has long been speculated he used this time partly to create another ambitious work, Le blog de Frantico, which was a comic strip blog published daily on the web for a whole year under the Frantico pseudonym.  In interviews and on his web sites, Trondheim alternately admits and denies having written Le blog de Frantico, though another author, Sébastien Lesage eventually stepped up and claimed to be the real author, saying he had asked Trondheim to help him maintain the mystery. To this day however, the true identity of Frantico remains unconfirmed.

Another recent Trondheim occupation is that of editorial director at Delcourt, where he manages Shampooing, a collection of comic books for young readers.

In 2006, Trondheim was awarded the Grand Prix de la ville d'Angoulême at the Angoulême International Comics Festival, arguably the most prestigious award in the field.

Awards
 1994: Award for First Comic Book at the Angoulême International Comics Festival, France
 1999: 2 nominations for the Harvey Award for Best American Edition of Foreign Material
 2000: Best German-language Comic—Import at the Max & Moritz Prizes, Germany
 - Inkpot Award, United States
 - nomination for the Harvey Award for Best American Edition of Foreign Material
 - nominated for Best Long Comic Strip at the Haxtur Awards, Spain
 2001: nomination for the Harvey Award for Best American Edition of Foreign Material
 - nomination for the Humour Award at the Angoulême International Comics Festival
 - nomination for Outstanding Story at the Ignatz Awards, USA
 2002: nomination for the Harvey Award for Best Presentation of Foreign Material
 - nomination for the Dialogue Award at the Angoulême International Comics Festival
 2004: Best International Series at the Prix Saint-Michel, Belgium
 - nomination for the Series Award at the Angoulême International Comics Festival
 2005: Series Award at the Angoulême International Comics Festival
 - nomination for the Prize for Artwork at the Angoulême International Comics Festival
 2006: Grand Prix de la ville d'Angoulême, France
 2007: nominated for the Ignatz Awards for Outstanding Series
 2008: nominated for the Eisner Awards for Best Short Story and Best Lettering
 2010: nominated for the Eisner Awards for Best Publication for Kids and Best U.S. Edition of International Material
 - nominated for the Award for Best Youth Comic at the Prix Saint-Michel
2016: Rudolph-Dirks-Award for Best Scenario for Ralph Azham and Herr Hase

Bibliography
Trondheim has written or drawn more than a hundred titles, spanning a large spectrum of genres; some of the most notable are:

 The Spiffy Adventures of McConey (Les formidables aventures de Lapinot; 10 official volumes), which mix satire and fantasy. The main characters are all animals: for instance McConey is a shy and easygoing rabbit, while Richard is an engaging cat with a loud mouth and a knack for getting into trouble. The stories alternate between modern France and stock historical settings. The recurring characters in the series can be thought of as actors who don't always play the same people, but always play the same type of roles.
 Dungeon (Donjon; more than 30 volumes), co-written with Joann Sfar, an extremely ambitious series which attempts to chronicle a Dungeons & Dragons-like dungeon through three separate epochs.  The tone varies from heroic to comic to rather dark.
 Several children comics, among them: Le roi catastrophe (8 volumes), drawn by Fabrice Parme, a series about a boy king; Monstrueux (3 volumes), featuring a young French family resembling Trondheim's, and their pet monster Jean-Christophe; Kaput and Zösky (2 volumes), featuring space aliens, which in recent years, has been converted into a television program; and more recently A.L.I.E.E.E.N., an "alien children book" Trondheim jokingly claims to have found in a country field while on vacation.
 Collections of short, modern comic strip fables, sometimes starring simplified, potato-shaped characters, the bulk of which has been published by L'Association (Genèses apocalyptiques, Non, non, non, Le pays des trois sourires, etc.)
 Autobiographical comics, such as those collected in Approximate Continuum Comics, which later formed his book Approximativement; as well as his more recent Carnet de bord series (3 volumes).  Newer autobiographical comics are regularly published on his blog under the title Les petits riens (serialized in English paperback volumes as Little Nothings).
 Various conceptual comics, such as Le dormeur and Psychanalyse, both of which were created entirely with a single photocopied panel, while Bleu and La nouvelle pornographie are both billed as "abstract comic books". After Psychanalyse, Trondheim was challenged by J.C. Menu to write a story with only 4 different panels, drawn by Menu. After some strips, Trondheim asked for four more panels,  and wrote the highly dense comic book, Moins d'un quart de seconde pour vivre. Such constrained writing achievements, reminiscent of OuLiPo writers, were a huge incentive for OuBaPo's creation.

English translations
Two volumes of McConey have been published in English by Fantagraphics in editions close to the original. In 2018, Dargaud also began releasing English translations with the title The Marvelous Adventures of McConey under the Europe Comics label. As of April 2018, three volumes have been published.

Fantagraphics has additionally published a range of shorter pieces by Trondheim in the comic The Nimrod. NBM has published Dungeon, both in comic book and graphic novel formats, as well as Little Nothings, a collection of autobiographical one-page vignettes.  English versions of A.L.I.E.E.N. (retitled A.L.I.E.E.E.N.) and Le Roi Catastrophe (retitled Tiny Tyrant) have been published by First Second.

References

External links

Lewis Trondheim official site 
Lewis Trondheim biography on Lambiek Comiclopedia
Lewis Trondheim biography at Fantagraphics.com
Dungeon catalogue NBM Publishing
The Comics Journal: Interview with Lewis Trondheim (Long excerpt from TCJ #283)

1964 births
Living people
People from Fontainebleau
French comics artists
French comics writers
Grand Prix de la ville d'Angoulême winners
French male writers